The following is a list of nicknames of AFC national association football teams.

Nicknames
 Nicknames in italics are commonly used in English.

Men's

Women's

See also
 List of national association football teams by nickname

References

Nickname AFC
National AFC